The 2023 Copa do Brasil (officially the Copa Betano do Brasil 2023 for sponsorship reasons) is the 35th edition of the Copa do Brasil football competition. It will be held between 21 February and 24 September 2023. Flamengo are the defending champions.

The competition is contested by 92 teams, either qualified by participating in their respective state championships (70), by the 2023 CBF ranking (10), by the 2022 Copa do Nordeste (1), by the 2022 Copa Verde (1), by the 2022 Série B (1), by the 2022 Série A (1) or those qualified for 2023 Copa Libertadores (8). 

The champions will qualify for the 2024 Copa Libertadores group stage and 2024 Supercopa do Brasil.

Qualified teams
Teams in bold are qualified directly for the third round.

Format
The competition is a single-elimination tournament, the first two rounds are played as a single match and the rest are played as a two-legged ties. Twelve teams enter in the third round, which are teams qualified for 2023 Copa Libertadores (8), Série A best team not qualified for 2023 Copa Libertadores, Série B champions, Copa Verde champions and Copa do Nordeste runners-up. The remaining 80 teams play in the first round, the 40 winners play the second round, and the 20 winners play the third round. Finally, the sixteen third round winners advance to the round of 16.

Schedule
The schedule of the competition will be as follows:

Draw

First round

Second round

Third round

Top goalscorers

References

2023
2023 in Brazilian football